James Seehafer is a painter and multi media artist known chiefly for founding the Massurrealist art genre.

Biography

Seehafer was born in the United States, the son of a professor of advertising, and grew up primarily in the New England area of the northeast. While pursuing painting and photography independently early in his life, Seehafer started displaying his paintings in the mid 1980s in both Connecticut and the Lower East Side of New York City where he participated in numerous exhibitions. In 1988 he enrolled in Parsons School of Design in New York. Through pursuing his painting, Seehafer initiated the use of mass media based sources in his work which led him to eventually coin the term 'massurrealism' in 1992. His first serious undertaking was a series of paintings of shopping carts which served as catalyst for this concept done in 1989–1990. He exhibited this series in a few venues in Connecticut as well in Boston, Massachusetts.

In 2005 Seehafer left the U.S. to work and live in Berlin (Germany) where he worked as a photographer as well continued his painting and mixed media work. Among them was a digital collage "Untitled 1990" which was based on his cart paintings and studies of the late 1980s and early 1990s. This particular image would be presented in different formats including a photo and mixed media version done in 2014.

There have been various academic papers and treatises on Massurrealism.

Notes and references

Further reading
 Seehafer, James / Morris, Michael / Kocsis, Phillip (2013). Three Essays About Massurrealism. Princeton: University Plaza Press. .
 Lantzen, Sean (2004). Massurrealism: A Dossier a.k.a. Massurrealismus: Ein Dossier (2004). Zurich: Novus Haus. .

External links
James Seehafer at massurrealism.org
Massurrealism – Urban Art Minute brief overview of the influences and origins (Art Media Journal)
Three Essays About Massurrealism audiobook version released in 2013. Narrated by Grover Gardner, 35 minutes
"Entering Unstable Nebula Of Don Quixote In Miami" South Florida Sun Sentinel

Year of birth missing (living people)
Living people
20th-century American painters
21st-century American painters
21st-century American male artists
Mixed-media artists
Parsons School of Design alumni
20th-century American male artists